Taizhou West railway station, is a railway station of Ningbo–Taizhou–Wenzhou railway and Jinhua–Taizhou railway located in Huangyan District, Taizhou, Zhejiang, China.

History
The station opened on September 28, 2009. It was renamed from Taizhou to Taizhou West on 25 June 2021, coinciding with the opening of the Jinhua–Taizhou railway.

Metro station
In the future, this station will be served by Line S2 of the Taizhou Rail Transit.

References

Railway stations in China opened in 2009
Railway stations in Zhejiang